Dawid Dynarek (born 9 March 1989) is a Polish professional football player who plays as a midfielder for Wiślanie Jaśkowice.

External links

1989 births
Living people
Polish footballers
Association football midfielders
People from Tychy
Sportspeople from Silesian Voivodeship
MKS Cracovia (football) players
Okocimski KS Brzesko players
Przebój Wolbrom players
Ekstraklasa players
II liga players
III liga players
IV liga players